Aga Khan University Hospital, Kampala, is a hospital under construction in Uganda, the third-largest economy in the East African Community. It is an urban, tertiary, referral and teaching hospital whose planned construction will last five years, starting in 2020. It will be built in two phases. The first phase will consist of 150 beds at an estimated cost of US$100 million. The bed capacity will be increased to 600 during the second phase.

Location
The hospital is located in the neighbourhood of Nakawa, near the junction of Kampala-Jinja Highway and New Port Bell Road, in Nakawa Division, one of the five administrative units of the Kampala Capital City Authority. The approximate coordinates of Aga Khan University Hospital, Kampala are: 0°19'30.0"N, 32°36'50.0"E (Laitude:0.325000; Longitude:32.613889).

Overview
When completed, this hospital will be the third tertiary referral and teaching hospital affiliated with the Aga Khan Network for Economic Development. The other two similar hospitals are located in Karachi, Pakistan and in Nairobi, Kenya. It will function as the teaching hospital of Aga Khan University, Kampala, one of four campuses in East Africa, with others in Nairobi, Arusha and Dar es Salaam.

Aga Khan University, Kampala
Aga Khan University, Kampala which currently trains nurses and midwives is expected to start training undergraduate and postgraduate doctors and surgeons at this hospital, when completed.

Construction
The foundation stone for the hospital was laid by the President of Uganda and His Highness the Aga Khan on Thursday, 17 December 2015.

The construction of the teaching hospital complex is expected to start in 2020. Completion is expected in 2022.

See also
List of hospitals in Uganda
List of universities in Uganda

References

External links
 Government backs Aga Khan on Naguru hospital project
 Aga Khan University to expand programmes 
 Aga Khan University boosting medical care in Uganda

Hospitals in Kampala
Teaching hospitals in Uganda
Nakawa Division